XHDB-FM is a radio station on 101.5 FM in Tonalá, Chiapas, Mexico. The station is owned by Radio Núcleo and known as Extremo.

History
XHDB-FM began as XEDB-AM 1290, with a concession awarded on July 10, 1968. It was owned by Alberto Muñoa Gómez. In 1988, ownership passed to a corporation, and in the early 2000s, XEDB moved from 1290 to 860 in order to increase daytime power from 1,000 watts to 5,000.

XEDB was cleared for AM-FM migration in November 2010.

References

1968 establishments in Mexico
Contemporary hit radio stations in Mexico
Radio stations established in 1968
Radio stations in Chiapas
Spanish-language radio stations